The 1999 Italian Open was a tennis tournament played on outdoor clay courts. It was the 56th edition of the Italian Open, and was part of the ATP Super 9 of the 1999 ATP Tour, and of the Tier I Series of the 1999 WTA Tour. Both the men's and the women's events took place at the Foro Italico in Rome, Italy.

The men's field was led by ATP No. 2, Rotterdam, Australian Open titlist Yevgeny Kafelnikov, Wimbledon, Vienna winner, Paris runner-up Pete Sampras and Sydney champion, Masters Cup winner Àlex Corretja. Also competing were US Open defending champion Patrick Rafter, London titlist Richard Krajicek, Carlos Moyá, Tim Henman and Marcelo Ríos.

The women's draw was headlined by the WTA No. 1, Australian Open, Tokyo winner, and Sydney finalist Martina Hingis; the Cairo titlist, and Hamburg semi-finalist Arantxa Sánchez Vicario; and  the Key Biscayne, Oklahoma, Hamburg champion Venus Williams. Other top seeds were Gold Coast runner-up Mary Pierce, Gold Coast champion Patty Schnyder, Indian Wells champion Serena Williams, and Frenchwomen Nathalie Tauziat and Sandrine Testud.

WTA entrants

Seeds

Other entrants
The following players received wildcards into the singles main draw:
  Tathiana Garbin
  Francesca Lubiani
  Adriana Serra Zanetti

The following players received wildcards into the doubles main draw:
  Flora Perfetti /  Francesca Lubiani
  Adriana Serra Zanetti /  Antonella Serra Zanetti

The following players received entry from the singles qualifying draw:

  Francesca Schiavone
  Christína Papadáki
  María Vento
  Sabine Appelmans
  Elena Dementieva
  Antonella Serra Zanetti
  Germana Di Natale
  Sandra Cacic

The following player received entry as a lucky loser:
  Tatiana Panova

The following players received entry from the doubles qualifying draw:

  Larissa Schaerer /  Magüi Serna

The following players received entry as lucky losers:
  Jana Kandarr /  Samantha Reeves

Finals

Men's singles

 Gustavo Kuerten defeated  Patrick Rafter, 6–4, 7–5, 7–6(8–6).
It was Gustavo Kuerten's 2nd title of the year and his 5th overall. It was his 2nd Masters title.

Women's singles

 Venus Williams defeated  Mary Pierce, 6–4, 6–2.
It was Venus Williams' 4th title of the year and her 7th overall. It was her 2nd Tier I title of the year and her 3rd overall.

Men's doubles

 Ellis Ferreira /  Rick Leach defeated  David Adams /  John-Laffnie de Jager, 6–7, 6–1, 6–2.

Women's doubles

 Martina Hingis /  Anna Kournikova defeated  Alexandra Fusai /  Nathalie Tauziat, 6–2, 6–2.

References

External links
 Official website

 
Italian Open
Italian Open
May 1999 sports events in Europe
Italian Open (tennis)